The Sun-Beaten Path is a 2011 Tibetan film direct by Sonthar Gyal. The film received the Dragons & Tigers Award at the 2011 Vancouver International Film Festival.

The film narrates the life of a grieving and guilt-ridden young farmer on his way back from a pilgrimage to Lhasa after he had killed his mother in a tragic road accident.

References

Tibetan-language films
Films about Tibet
2011 films
Films directed by Sonthar Gyal